The tenth season of Let's Dance started on February 24, 2017, with the first ever launch show and continued with the normal competition from March 17. Sylvie Meis and Daniel Hartwich returned as hosts. Motsi Mabuse, Joachim Llambi and Jorge Gonzalez also returned as the judges.

Couples
The first twelve celebrities were announced in January 2017. While Vanessa Mai and Pietro Lombardi were announced as the final contestants a few days later. On February 22, all professional dancers were revealed by RTL. Christian Polanc, Massimo Sinató, Oana Nechiti, Erich Klann, Ekaterina Leonova, Vadim Garbuzov, Sergiu Luca, Kathrin Menzinger, Isabel Edvardsson and Robert Beitsch are all returning from last season, Sarah Latton and Marta Arndt are returning after a 2 and 4 years break, while only two new pros (Christina Luft and Andrzej Cibis) were announced. Pietro Lombardi had to withdraw from the competition on the launch show because of an injury on his foot. He will be replaced. He would have danced with new pro Christina Luft. On March 3 it was announced that Giovanni Zarrella replace Lombardi.

On May 23 it was announced that Heinrich Popow would withdraw from the competition due to health reasons including a tendon rupture in his right shoulder. Owing to the rules of the show, Giovanni Zarrella, who had been eliminated the week before, was reinvited to participate on the show again.

Scoring chart

Red numbers indicates the lowest score for each week.
Green numbers indicates the highest score for each week.
 indicates the couple eliminated that week.
 indicates the returning couple that finished in the bottom two.
 indicates the couple which was immune from elimination.
 indicates the couple that withdrew from the competition.
 indicates the couple was eliminated but later returned to the competition.
 indicates the winning couple.
 indicates the runner-up couple.
 indicates the third-place couple.

Averages 
This table only counts for dances scored on a traditional 30-points scale.

Highest and lowest scoring performances 
The best and worst performances in each dance according to the judges' marks are as follows:

Couples' Highest and lowest scoring performances
According to the traditional 30-point scale. Pietro Lombardi is not listed because he withdrew before the first live show.

Weekly scores and songs

Launch show
For the first time there was a launch show in which each celebrity meets his partner. This show was aired on 24 February 2017. In this first live show the couples then danced in groups and each couple got points by the judges and the viewers. At the end of the show the couple with the highest combined points was granted immunity from the first elimination. Pietro Lombardi was unable to perform due to an injury on his foot and had to withdraw from the competition. He was replaced during the next days. Vanessa Mai won the immunity from the first elimination.

Key
 Celebrity won immunity from the first elimination

The Team dances

Week 1 
 During the launch show on February 24, Pietro Lombardi announced his withdrawal from the show due to his injury. There will be a replacement for Lombardi in form of Giovanni Zarrella. 
 Vanessa Mai was immune from elimination after earning it in the launch show. 
 Each couple reprised the dance the celebrity danced during the launch show. 
 Baastian Ragas could not dance this week due to an appendectomy and was given by.
Running order

Week 2: 80's Special 

Running order

Week 3: 90's Special 

Running order

Week 4: Boys vs Girls Battle
 This week featured a "Boys vs Girls Battle" dance where the male pro dancers and celebrities competed against the female pro dancers and celebrities. Each group received a score which was added to their individual score from the first dance. The Songs of the battle were announced at the end of week 3.
Running order

Week 5: Number One Hits
 At the end of week 4 professional dancer Isabel Edvardsson announced her pregnancy and therefore won't participate any longer. Sarah Latton was announced as the new partner of Maxi Arland. This show was aired on April 21 because of the Easter holidays. 
 Due to an injury of Christina Luft during the dress rehearsal, Giovanni Zarrella will dance with Marta Arndt instead.
 
Running order

Week 6

Running order

Week 7: Movie Night

Running order

Week 8 

Running order

Week 9: Magic Moments
 This Week the couples danced a freestyle to a special moment of their lives and a dance duel.
Running order

Week 10: Fusion Night 
 This week each couple will perform a non learned dance and the second dance will be a fusion dance to a Schlager song, consisting out of two different dances.
 On May 23 it was announced that Heinrich Popow would withdraw from the competition due to health reasons including a tendon rupture in his right shoulder. Owing to the rules of the show, Giovanni Zarrella, who had been eliminated the week before, was reinvited to participate on the show again.

Running order

Week 11: Semi-Final
 For the third time on the show every semi-finalist had to learn three individual dances while the third dance will be an "impro dance" for which the couples got the music only 3 minutes before their performance. They didn't know the dance style and their costumes either. This was the shortest amount of time to prepare.

Running order

Week 12: Final

Running order

Encore performances by the eliminated couples

Dance chart
 Highest scoring dance
 Lowest scoring dance
 Did not scored (encore performance in the finale)
 The pair did not perform this week
 Withdrew from the competition

Notes

References

External links
 Official website

Let's Dance (German TV series)
2017 German television seasons